Sheena S. Iyengar is a former S.T. Lee Professor of Business in the Management Department at Columbia Business School, widely and best known as an expert on choice. Her research focuses on the many facets of decision making, including: why people want choice, what affects how and what we choose, and how we can improve our decision making. She has presented TED talks on choice and is the author of The Art of Choosing (2010).<ref
name="TheArtOfChoosing2010"></ref>

Early life and education 
Iyengar was born in Toronto, Ontario, Canada.  Her parents were  immigrants from Delhi, India.  As a child, she was diagnosed with a rare form of retinitis pigmentosa, an inherited disease of retinal degeneration. By the age of nine, she could no longer read.  By the age of sixteen, she was completely blind, although able to perceive light.  She remains blind as an adult.

Iyengar's father died of a heart attack when she was thirteen.  This change in family circumstances, and Iyengar's loss of vision, prompted Iyengar's mother to steer her towards higher education and self-sufficiency, saying to Iyengar:  "I don't want to hear about men or boys, you've got to stand on your own two feet."

In 1992, she graduated from the University of Pennsylvania with a B.S. in economics from the Wharton School and a B.A. in psychology from the College of Arts and Sciences.  She then earned her Ph.D. in Social Psychology from Stanford University in 1997.

For her dissertation "Choice and its Discontents," Iyengar received the Best Dissertation Award for 1998 from the Society of Experimental Social Psychology.<ref
name="SocPsychNet2009">
</ref>

Academic career 

Iyengar's first faculty appointment was at the Sloan School of Management at MIT from July 1997 to June 1998.  In 1998, Iyengar joined the faculty at the Columbia Business School, starting as an assistant professor.  She has been a full professor at Columbia from July 2007 onward and, since November 2009, the inaugural S.T. Lee Professor of Business.

Her principal line of research concerns the psychology of choice, and she has been studying how people perceive and respond to choice since the 1990s.  She has authored or coauthored over 30 journal articles.  Her research and statements have been cited often in the print media,<ref
name="IyengarMediaCov">
</ref> including by Bloomberg Business Week,<ref
name="BusWeek20121231">
</ref> CityLab,<ref
name="CityLab20120629">
</ref> Money Magazine,<ref
name="MoneyMag20100602"></ref> The New York Times, and The Washington Post.<ref
name="WashPost20060208">
</ref>  Media appearances include The Diane Rehm Show<ref
name="DRShow20100303">
</ref> (NPR), Marketplace<ref
name="Marketplace20110610">
</ref> (APM).

Iyengar was the recipient of the 2001 Presidential Early Career Award for Scientists and Engineers<ref
name="GWB200206">
</ref> for, as the NSF said, "helping lead to a better understanding of how cultural, individual, and situational dimensions of human decision-making can be used to improve people's lives."<ref
name="ColumbiaNews20020918">
</ref>  In 2011, Iyengar was named a member of the Thinkers50, a global ranking of the top 50 management thinkers.<ref
name="Thinkers50About"></ref>  In 2012, she was awarded the Dean's Award for Outstanding Core Teaching from Columbia Business School.<ref
name="ColumbiaNewsroom20121017">
</ref>

Non-academic works 

In addition to the journal articles mentioned above, Iyengar has written non-academic articles, including for CNN<ref
name="CNN20100505">
</ref><ref
name="CNN20110511"></ref> and Slate,<ref
name="Slate20100601">
</ref> and many book chapters.  She has also presented two TED talks:  "The Art of Choosing" (2010) and "How to Make Choosing Easier" (2012).

The book she is most known for, The Art of Choosing (2010), explores the mysteries of choice in everyday life.  It was listed third in Amazon's top ten books in Business & Investing of 2010<ref
name="KentState20160809">
</ref> and was shortlisted for the 2010 Financial Times and Goldman Sachs Business Book of the Year Award.<ref
name="FT20100916">
</ref>

In the Afterword of the 2011 edition of The Art of Choosing, Iyengar distills one aspect of her work explaining and advocating for choice, arguing for people to take responsibility for their lives and not rely on a supposed fate determined by some "greater force out there." She says:  "Choice allows us to be architects of our future."

Personal life 

Iyengar is divorced from Garud Iyengar, another Columbia University professor. She lives in New York City and shares custody of their son, Ishaan.

See also 
Choice: judgement and decision-making
Choice overload
Cultural identity
Decision theory
Social psychology
Daniel Kahneman

References

External links

 List of media coverage from official website
 Columbia Business School directory entry

Living people
American business writers
American women psychologists
Women business writers
American people of Punjabi descent
American Sikhs
American social psychologists
Canadian blind people
Canadian business writers
Canadian people of Punjabi descent
Canadian Sikhs
Canadian women psychologists
Columbia University people
People from Elmwood Park, New Jersey
Scientists from New Jersey
Scientists from Toronto
Stanford University alumni
Wharton School of the University of Pennsylvania alumni
Writers from New Jersey
Writers from Toronto
Year of birth missing (living people)
21st-century American women
Recipients of the Presidential Early Career Award for Scientists and Engineers
Scientists with disabilities
Blind academics